Daniel Jiménez López (born March 18, 1996) is a Mexican footballer who plays as a midfielder for Pioneros de Cancún.

Early life
Jiménez was born in La Barca, Jalisco but he and his family are from the town of Jamay, Jalisco. He played for youth teams in Jamay until he was recruited by Chiapas F.C. scouts at age 14.

Career

Chiapas F.C.
Jiménez made his professional debut on 22 January 2014 at the age of 18 during a Copa MX match against Oaxaca. He made his Liga MX debut on 31 October 2015 under coach Ricardo La Volpe in a match against Puebla.

References

External links
 

Living people
1996 births
Association football midfielders
Chiapas F.C. footballers
Cafetaleros de Chiapas footballers
Tuxtla F.C. footballers
Pioneros de Cancún footballers
Ascenso MX players
Liga Premier de México players
Footballers from Jalisco
Mexican footballers